Wild Geese II is a 1985 British action-thriller film directed by Peter Hunt, based on the 1982 novel The Square Circle by Daniel Carney, in which a group of mercenaries are hired to spring Rudolf Hess from Spandau Prison in Berlin. The film is a sequel to the 1978 film The Wild Geese, which was also produced by Euan Lloyd and adapted from a novel by Carney. Richard Burton, who starred in the first film as Colonel Allen Faulkner, was planning to reprise his role, but died days before filming began. Faulkner is replaced by his brother played by Edward Fox as one of the mercenaries. No characters from the original are featured in the sequel.

Plot
Africa, 1977
Veteran mercenary Allen Faulkner trains and then leads a group of 50 hired soldiers in an attempt to rescue deposed President Julius Limbani. After initially being successful the mission begins to fall apart; double-crossed and caught in the open, Faulkner's men are strafed and napalmed by an enemy plane. With what few men remain Faulkner looks to escape the country in an old Dakota aeroplane. With only his best friend Rafer Janders left to board the plane, Janders is shot in the leg and can't catch the taxiing plane. As the hordes of ferocious Simbas are virtually upon him, Janders calls for Faulkner to kill him, which he regretfully does.

London, 1982
As the only surviving Nazi leader in captivity, Rudolf Hess has secrets that could destroy the careers of prominent political figures, secrets an international news network will pay any price to get.

As Alex Faulkner arrives for a meeting, Robert McCann is arguing with Michael Lukas about the delay of a planned rescue of Rudolf Hess.

Faulkner is escorted into the office; there he meets network executives Michael and Kathy Lukas, who ask him to free Hess - a request which he refuses. He does recommend John Haddad as a substitute. As this is happening, former Lebanese American soldier turned mercenary Haddad avoids Palestinian hitmen in London. Later Kathy and Michael hire Haddad to free Hess and get him safely out of West Berlin.

When Haddad arrives in West Berlin he stakes out the outside of Spandau Prison as a jogger while being spied on. He drafts plans of the outside of the prison including guard towers and entrances. The next day Haddad joins a construction team and sneaks away to get into the prison guard entrance. Carefully eluding the guards by studying their timed patrols he drafts floor plans of the hallways and cell blocks.

When he leaves the prison with the construction crew, Haddad is abducted by Karl Stroebling who is a Nazi but works for the Soviet Union. Stroebling and his thugs smother Haddad with a plastic bag over his head to torture him into disclosing details about his mission. Haddad escapes by overpowering the thugs and rolls across the street, barely missing being run over by an oncoming truck as the police arrive and witness the incident.

While recovering in hospital, Haddad is visited by British Colonel Reed-Henry. Reed-Henry questions Haddad but to no avail; he leaves Haddad but suspects he is there to rescue Hess. Haddad leaves the hospital and, with Kathy, goes to Bavaria to plan the mission without interference from Stroebling.

Haddad enlists his old mercenary comrade Faulkner to watch his back. Faulkner, a former British Army officer, is working as an assassin and is an expert marksman. As romance between Haddad and Kathy blossoms, the trio returns to West Berlin to find that Reed-Henry will help Haddad release Hess. Reed-Henry claims that the British secretly want to get rid of Hess because the old man's presence is a reason for the Soviets to have military in the British sector. Once again, Stroebling's thug's attempt to kill Haddad, but this time Faulkner helps him kill all but one of them.

Meeting with Reed-Henry to discuss his plan, Haddad agrees to hand over Hess to the colonel in exchange for help from Regimental Sergeant Major James Murphy. Murphy, an ex-warden at Spandau prison, informs Haddad of the prison routine and helps make the mercenaries look like British Royal Military Police. Stroebling offers to remove a contract on Haddad's life in exchange for Hess and the death of Faulkner. Haddad refuses and Stroebling leaves, frustrated.

The plan is finalised, with the news network, Reed-Henry and Stroebling each believing they will receive Hess. Part of the plan involves a staged traffic accident, so Haddad employs fairground wall of death rider Pierre to perform the deliberate crash.

Attempting to force Haddad into a vulnerable position using blackmail, Stroebling kidnaps Kathy. In exchange for guaranteeing her safety, Haddad must have a member of Stroebling's gang Patrick Hourigan join the rescue group.

Haddad and Faulkner are now joined by Kathy's brother and Lebanese mercenaries Joseph and Jamil. The group, including Hourigan, are trained by Murphy. During one of Faulkner's fever spells, Hourigan substitutes Faulkner's medication with LSD tablets causing hallucinations.

After the training is finished, Hourigan taunts Murphy about an IRA ambush he participated in. Murphy shoots Hourigan dead, putting Haddad in a dilemma over Kathy's safety. Haddad enlists his final team members, Arab businessman Mustapha El Ali and his employees, to take a couple of minor parts in the rescue. To appease Stroebling, Haddad offers Michael as extra insurance.

Haddad must rescue Michael and Kathy from the clutches of Stroebling. Michael creates a diversion for him and Kathy to escape but is killed during the struggle when the guard retrieves his handgun and shoots him. Moments later Haddad kills the guards and rescues Kathy. The plan goes ahead as scheduled but Pierre is killed in the staged accident.

Hess is sedated with an anaesthetic, switched with the look-alike corpse from the other ambulance and placed into a waiting jeep. At the rendezvous point at the Kaiser Wilhelm Memorial Reed-Henry tries to intercept Hess, but discovers that he has been duped into killing Stroebling disguised as a guard.

Kathy, Haddad and Faulkner take a drugged Hess to and from a football game. Together with the Austrian fans, they travel to an East German airport to flee to Vienna. They succeed by killing a curious East German customs officer.

Reed-Henry confesses to his Russian superiors that Hess has escaped with his rescuers and is nowhere to be found. He accepts execution by being shot with his own pistol.

Epilogue
Haddad, and Kathy and Faulkner take Hess to a hotel in Vienna, Austria. He overhears Kathy talking on the phone to McCann about the rescue and Michael's death.

Hess, knowing that he is being exploited, tells Kathy, Haddad and Faulkner that he has no desire to be a part of modern society. He has regrets about the millions of deaths. Haddad and Faulkner try to talk him into accepting his freedom, but he insists on going back to Spandau to live out the rest of his life. The following day Haddad, Kathy and Faulkner take Hess to the French embassy where he turns himself in. An article of a newspaper in the following days tells a story about a false rumour of Hess's escape.

Cast
 Scott Glenn - John Haddad
 Barbara Carrera - Kathy Lukas
 Edward Fox - Alex Faulkner
 Laurence Olivier - Rudolf Hess
 Robert Webber - Robert McCann
 Kenneth Haigh - Colonel Reed-Henry
 Stratford Johns - Mustapha El Ali
 John Terry - Michael Lukas
 Robert Freitag - Karl Stroebling
 Ingrid Pitt - Hooker
 Patrick Stewart - Russian general
 Paul Antrim - RSM. Murphy
 Derek Thompson - Patrick Hourigan
 Michael N. Harbour - Ilya, KGB man
 David Lumsden - Joseph
 Malcolm Jamieson - Pierre  
 Billy Boyle - Devenish  
 Richard Burton - Allen Faulkner (archive footage)
 Richard Harris - Rafer Janders (archive footage)
 Winston Ntshona - Julius Limbani (archive footage)
 Brook Williams - Private Samuels (archive footage)
 Glyn Baker - Private Esposito (archive footage)

Production
The original film had not been particularly popular in the US but performed better around the world. In April 1984 Richard Burton and Scott Glenn were announced as stars. Roger Moore was asked to reprise his role from the first film, but did not like the sequel's script. Lewis Collins claimed he was originally signed to play Haddad due to a contract with producer Euan Lloyd but the role went to the American Scott Glenn.

Burton said after making the film he intended "to retire again for at least six months". In August 1984, a week before filming was to begin, Burton died of a heart attack at his home in Geneva. Producer Euan Lloyd had just visited him: "He looked tan and healthy and had just passed his physical examination for the film after a nice holiday in Switzerland". Burton was replaced by Edward Fox.

In January 1985, Thorn EMI split the cost of a five-picture £38 million slate of films they had made, including Dream Child, A Passage to India, Morons from Outer Space, The Holcroft Covenant and Wild Geese 2.

The film opens with a dedication to the previous film's lead actor Richard Burton, followed by a brief summary of that film.

Then-77-year-old Laurence Olivier, who portrayed Rudolf Hess, was in poor health during filming requiring a nurse to accompany him during production. He was also beginning to suffer with memory problems. Edward Fox recalled him labouring for hours on his one long speech. Ingrid Pitt, who acted in the film but didn't have any scenes with him, did have dinner with Olivier during the production and described him as "very old and frail by this time but very gallant". Hess's son Wolf Rudiger Hess said afterwards that Olivier's likeness of his father was "uncannily accurate".

Patrick Stewart appears in a small role as a Russian general. By his own admission, he only took the role to pay for much needed home repairs. He felt his appearance was the biggest embarrassment of his career.

Notes

External links
 
 
 
 
 
 Patrick Stewart talks about Wild Geese II

1985 films
British action adventure films
1985 action thriller films
British action thriller films
Films set in Berlin
Films set in London
Films set in Vienna
Films directed by Peter R. Hunt
Films with screenplays by Reginald Rose
Films scored by Roy Budd
Films shot in Berlin
Films set in 1977
Films set in 1982
EMI Films films
Australian action adventure films
Films set in East Germany
Films set in West Germany
1980s English-language films
1980s British films